is a district located in Kumamoto Prefecture, Japan.

As of the Yamato merger (but with 2003 population statistics), the district had an estimated population of 90,315 and a density of 115.2 persons per square kilometer. The total area is 784.03 km2.

Towns and villages
Kashima
Kōsa
Mashiki
Mifune
Yamato

Mergers
On February 11, 2005, the municipalities of Yabe and Seiwa merged with the town of Soyō from Aso District to form the new town of Yamato.

Districts in Kumamoto Prefecture